The Magdeburg tramway network is a network of tramways forming part of the public transport system in Magdeburg, the capital city of the federal state of Saxony-Anhalt, Germany.

Rolling stock
The fleet of the Magdeburg tram network consists of 83 LHB low-floor trams, 8 Tatra KT4Dmod trams, 4 Tatra T6A2M trams and 13 B6A2M trailers. A tender for 35 new trams is planned, with deliveries scheduled to begin in 2022.

For assistance in case of a derailment, for rerailing and for hauling defective trams, the MVB uses a modified Unimog road–rail vehicle with a lengthened wheelbase of 4,500mm and a power output of 240 PS.

See also
List of town tramway systems in Germany
Trams in Germany

References

Notes

Further reading

External links

 

Magdeburg
Magdeburg
Rail transport in Magdeburg
Transport in Magdeburg
Magdeburg
600 V DC railway electrification